The 1899 Buchtel football team represented Buchtel College in the 1899 college football season. The team was led by first-year head coach Archie Eves, in his only season. Buchtel outscored their opponents by a total of 26–11.

Schedule

References

Buchtel
Akron Zips football seasons
Buchtel football